King Cobb Steelie is the self-titled debut album by King Cobb Steelie, released in 1993 on Raw Energy Records.

Track listing

 "Bundt"
 "Jackasshole"
 "Duotang"
 "Dangerous Dangling Arm"
 "Talking GI Joe with Lifelike Beard and Hair and Kung-fu Grip"
 "Time=Money & Money=Pizza ∴ Time=Pizza."
 "Luckily I Keep My Feathers Numbered for Just Such an Emergency"
 "Juggernaut"
 "Shucked"
 "The Big Small Syndrome"
 "Tomato/Tomahto"
 "Bar Mitzvah in Ann Arbor"
 "Extra Mild"
 "One's a Heifer"
 "Deadly Lampshade"
 "Kuehe Mit Fangzaehnen"

References

1993 debut albums
King Cobb Steelie albums